Colin Crowley (born 1977) is an Irish retired Gaelic footballer who played for club side Castlehaven, at inter-county level with the Cork senior football team and with Munster.

Career

Crowley first played Gaelic football at juvenile and underage levels with Castlehaven before joining the club's senior team as a 17-year-old. His performances in these grades resulted in his inclusion on the Cork minor and under-21 teams. Crowley enjoyed his first major club success when Castlehaven won the Munster Club Championship in 1997. He won a County Under-21 Championship medal the following year. Crowley joined the Cork senior football team in 2002 and won a Munster Championship medal in his debut year. He won a County Senior Championship title with Castlehaven in 2003, a victory which resulted in him taking over the captaincy of the Cork senior team in 2004.

Career statistics

Club

Inter-county

Honours

Castlehaven
Munster Senior Club Football Championship: 1997
Cork Senior Football Championship: 2003
Cork Under-21 A Football CHampionship: 1998
West Cork Under-21 A Football Championship: 1998

Cork
Munster Senior Football Championship: 2002

References

1977 births
Living people
Castlehaven Gaelic footballers
Cork inter-county Gaelic footballers
Munster inter-provincial Gaelic footballers